Henga refers to:

 , original name for Yor the Hunter
 Henga, a cultivar of Karuka
 Henga, another name for the Tumbuka people in south central Africa